Iferouane Airport  is an airport serving Iferouane, Niger. It is located just west of the town.

See also
Transport in Niger

References

 OurAirports - Niger
  Great Circle Mapper - Iferouane
 Iferouane Airport
 Google Earth

External links

Airports in Niger